Ristovski is a surname that has Macedonian origin. The form of the surname Ristovski is for males, while Ristovska is for females. Notable people with the surname include:

 Blaže Ristovski, Macedonian literary historian
 Borko Ristovski, Macedonian handball player
 Dejan Ristovski, Macedonian footballer
 Laza Ristovski, Serbian musician
 Lazar Ristovski, Serbian actor
 Mendo Ristovski, Australian footballer
 Stefan Ristovski (footballer, born February 1992), Macedonian footballer
 Stefan Ristovski (footballer, born December 1992), Macedonian footballer
 Svetozar Ristovski, Macedonian film director

Macedonian-language surnames